Lottie Cunningham Wren (born 1959) is a Miskito Nicaraguan lawyer, environmentalist, and Indigenous rights activist from Nicaragua. 

Cunningham was born on September 29, 1959, in the village of Bilwaskarma, located on the Rio Coco, Nicaragua.

Cunningham founded the Center for Justice and Human Rights of the Atlantic Coast of Nicaragua. She received the 2020 Right Livelihood Award, also known as the "Alternative Nobel Prize," for her work defending the rights of Indigenous and Afro-descendant peoples to their land.

References 

1959 births
Human rights lawyers
Indigenous rights activists
Living people
Miskito people
Central American University (Managua) alumni